Becker's is a Canadian chain of independent convenience stores selling products of Alimentation Couche-Tard company. The original Becker Milk Company was founded in 1957 in Toronto, Ontario. The chain grew from 5 to 500 stores and was sold in 2006 to Alimentation Couche-Tard. The company converted the company-owned stores to Mac's Milk and later to Circle K, leaving a remnant of affiliate Becker's stores. Starting in 2013, Alimentation Couche-Tard began expanding the affiliate program. There are now over 40 stores in Ontario.

Convenience stores
Becker's Milk was a franchised chain of convenience stores in Ontario, Canada. The company had over 500 stores, owned 74 retail stores and 91 franchised locations before being sold to Mac's Convenience Stores. The founders of Beckers were Frank Bazos and Robert W. Lowe Sr.

Dairy
Becker Milk products included store brand items:
 Milk
 Cream
 Fruit Juices
 Soda Pop (cola, grape, cream soda, ginger ale, lime, root beer)
 Popsicles (chocolate, banana)
 Ice Cream
 Jungle Joose

Asset sale to Silcorp

The assets of Becker's were acquired by Silcorp, parent company of rival Mac's Convenience Stores in November 1996.  Becker's continues operation as a property owner.  Silcorp was acquired by Alimentation Couche-Tard in April 1999.  Since that merger, the Becker's name has been retired, as Couche-Tard focuses on its core Mac's banner. The Becker's flower is now part of the Daisy Mart banner, an independent network of stores affiliated with Mac's in Ontario.

Milk products under the Becker's trade name were sold in Becker's, Mac's, Mike's Mart, and Winks locations until May 2006.

References

External links

 

Alimentation Couche-Tard
Dairy products companies of Canada
1957 establishments in Ontario
Convenience stores of Canada
Retail companies established in 1957